Denis Istomin was the champion in 2007 and 2008, but he chose to not compete this year.
Rainer Eitzinger won in the final 6–3, 1–6, 7–6(3), against Ivan Sergeyev.

Seeds

Draw

Final four

Top half

Bottom half

References
 Main draw
 Qualifying draw

2009 ATP Challenger Tour
2009 Singles